Robert Floyd Judd (February 12, 1956 – August 24, 2019) was an American musicologist who served as the executive director of the American Musicological Society from  September 1996 until his death on August 24, 2019.

Early life and education 
Judd was raised in Shaker Heights, Ohio, where he began performing music as a child. He earned an undergraduate degree in organ performance from Kent State University, master's degree in musicology from Rice University, and a doctorate in musicology from the University of Oxford. His doctoral thesis was titled, The Use of Notational Formats at the Keyboard.

Career 
Judd's academic research focused on Renaissance-era keyboard music. He became a tenured professor at the California State University, Fresno. In 1996, he became the executive director of the American Musicological Society at New York University. He served in the position for 23 years.

Death 
Judd died on August 24, 2019 in Bronxville, New York.

References 

American musicologists
2019 deaths
1956 births
Alumni of the University of Oxford
Rice University alumni
Kent State University alumni
People from Shaker Heights, Ohio